The role of a Wales national football team manager was first established in 1876, when the Wales national football team was established, and the team was chosen by a panel of selectors. The team captain would at that point fulfil the role of match day coach. Since 1954 a manager has been appointed by the Football Association of Wales.

Thirteen men have occupied the post since its inception; four more acted in short-term caretaker manager roles: Brian Flynn (two games in charge), Trevor Morris (one game), David Williams (one game), and Neville Southall (one game), alongside Mark Hughes.

The longest serving manager is Dave Bowen, who was manager for ten years before leaving in 1974. Bowen was in charge of the team for fifty-three games, winning ten. However, his win percentage of 20% is the lowest of all Wales managers. The most successful manager in terms of wins was John Toshack. Wales has never had a non-British manager but Mike Smith became the first English manager to lead Wales in 1974.

Jimmy Murphy, Chris Coleman and Rob Page are the only managers to have taken the team to any FIFA World Cup or UEFA European Championship finals. Murphy led his team to the 1958 FIFA World Cup quarter-finals, where they were knocked out by Brazil. Coleman led his team to the UEFA Euro 2016 semi-finals, where they were knocked out by eventual winners Portugal. Under Coleman, Wales peaked at eighth in the FIFA world rankings.

Position

Role 
The Wales manager's role means he has sole responsibility for all on-the-field elements of the Wales team. Among other activities, this includes selecting the national team, starting lineup, captain, tactics, substitutes, and penalty-takers. Before 1954 a "panel of selectors" would manage all issues barring the actual match day team selection, formation, and tactics, which was left to the head coach for the event.

The manager is given a free hand in selecting his coaching ("back room") staff. The Wales manager may also involve himself in wider issues beyond the on-the-field team issues. On a more tactical level, a host of other details can be influenced. For example current manager Ryan Giggs was given the choice by the FAW Chief Executive of whether to play fixtures at the team's current ground (the Cardiff City Stadium) or its previous venue (the Millennium Stadium).

The national team manager is tasked with the role of continuing the club like relationship between players and fans, first brought in by Gary Speed.It is now part of the “Welsh Way”, which former assistant manager, Osian Roberts brought in via the FAW Coaching Program. It is taught to numerous of former players or aspiring coaches sitting their coaching badges with the FAW.

Appointment 
The current process of appointing a new Wales manager is through an FAW panel, consisting of the CEO and six members of the board.

List of managers
 Caretaker manager is indicated with a (c).
 BOLD names indicates that the manager has taken the team to a FIFA World Cup or UEFA European Championship finals.

Managers at the World Cup/European Championship finals

 Draws also include penalties.

References

 
Lists of national association football team managers